The 1985–86 St. Francis Terriers men's basketball team represented St. Francis College during the 1985–86 NCAA Division I men's basketball season. The team was coached by Bob Valvano, who was in his second year at the helm of the St. Francis Terriers. The Terrier's home games were played at the  Generoso Pope Athletic Complex. The team has been a member of the Northeast Conference since 1981, although at this time the conference was known as the ECAC Metro Conference.

The Terriers finished their season at 9–19 overall and 4–12 in conference play. They qualified for the NEC Tournament with the 7th seed, but lost in the opening round to eventual tournament champions Marist.

Jim Paguaga had two record setting games. On February 7, he recorded a program-record 16 assists against York College, and three days later on February 10, he recorded a then-program record 8 steals against Monmouth. The record was surpassed by Ron Arnold on February 4, 1993 when he recorded 11 stelas against Mount St. Mary's. Paguaga also set the Terrier record for most steals in a season with 120, which is 13th all-time in NCAA history.

Roster

Schedule and results

|-
!colspan=12 style="background:#0038A8; border: 2px solid #CE1126;;color:#FFFFFF;"| Regular season
  

  
     
      
   

  

 

 

    

 

|-
!colspan=12 style="background:#0038A8; border: 2px solid #CE1126;;color:#FFFFFF;"| ECAC Metro tournament

References

St. Francis Brooklyn Terriers men's basketball seasons
St. Francis
St. Francis Brooklyn Terriers men's basketball
St. Francis Brooklyn Terriers men's basketball